Pokegama may refer to:

Bodies of water in the United States
 Pokegama Bay, a bay in Wisconsin
 Pokegama Creek, a stream in Minnesota
 Pokegama Lake (Minnesota), two lakes in Minnesota
 Pokegama Lake, a lake in Minong (town), Wisconsin
 Pokegama Lake, a lake in Vilas County, Wisconsin
 Pokegama River, a river in Wisconsin

Communities in the United States
 Pokegama, Minnesota
 Pokegama Township, Pine County, Minnesota
 Pokegama, Wisconsin

Native American establishments
 Pokegama Lake Indian Reservation, a former reservation established for the Pokegama Lake Band of Mississippi Chippewa
 Pokegama Lake Band, a subtribe of the Mississippi River Band of Chippewa Indians

See also